Tsuen Wan Centre is one of the 17 constituencies in the Tsuen Wan District. The constituency returns one district councillor to the Tsuen Wan District Council, with an election every four years.

Tsuen Wan Centre constituency is loosely based on the Tsuen Wan Centre, Kam Fung Garden and part of Tsuen Tak Gardens in Tsuen Wan with estimated population of 14,883.

Councillors represented

Election results

2010s

2000s

1990s

References

Tsuen Wan
Constituencies of Hong Kong
Constituencies of Tsuen Wan District Council
1999 establishments in Hong Kong
Constituencies established in 1999